Who Killed Captain Alex? is a 2010 Ugandan action comedy film written, produced, and directed by Nabwana Isaac Geoffrey Godfrey (IGG), by Wakaliwood, an ultra low-budget studio in Kampala, Uganda. The film gained viral notoriety for being a no-budget action film, produced on a reported budget of under $200 although producer Alan Hofmanis later stated that the production value was in fact $85. A trailer for the film was uploaded to YouTube in January 2010 and the full film was uploaded in March 2010, and has been viewed over 8.1 million times as of January 2023. The original version of the film was lost due to power outages and "strained conditions" according to Nabwana, while the surviving version of Who Killed Captain Alex? released online includes commentary from an English-speaking "Video Joker" that includes running gags about the characters.

Who Killed Captain Alex? was generally received well by critics and audiences alike, who saw it as an endearing "so bad it's good" experience, despite its technical limitations.

Plot 
Captain Alex, one of the most decorated officers in the Uganda People's Defence Force, is sent out to capture the crime boss Richard and his Tiger Mafia, a criminal organization that controls the drug trade of the city of Kampala. Alex sets up camp in the village of Wakaliga, and manages to capture Richard's brother during a commando operation. Richard becomes antagonized, and sends a spy to seduce the Captain so that the Mafia can capture him later. Unexpectedly, Alex is found dead that night, with the murderer having escaped.

Captain Alex's brother, a Ugandan shaolin monk named Bruce U arrives at Kampala in search of the murderer. Bruce meets up at a local shaolin temple and battles with its martial artists in order to meet the temple's master. Bruce asks the master to help him on his quest for vengeance, but the latter declines. After sleeping in a tree for the night, he encounters and bonds with a woman named Ritah, one of Richard's wives who suffered amnesia after being shot by her husband. After recalling her past, she agrees to take Bruce to the base of the Tiger Mafia.

The UPDF, now deprived of a leader, struggles to formulate a plan for capturing Richard. A new military commander is chosen to replace Alex, and he devises a plan to attack a schoolhouse that serves as the Mafia's base. Richard eavesdrops on the meeting using the phone of a turncoat soldier, and devises a plan to foil the attack. He orders his subordinate Puffs to use a stolen helicopter to bomb Kampala as a diversion, while the Mafia prepares to defend the schoolhouse. As Puffs wreaks havoc on Kampala with the helicopter, Bruce is captured by the Tiger Mafia as he attempts to enter the base.

Richard commands Puffs' new henchmen to attack Bruce as a test of their combat skills. Although Bruce manages to temporarily fight the men off, he is eventually overwhelmed. The military intervenes by bombing the schoolhouse with a helicopter, forcing the Tiger Mafia to evacuate. The UPDF chases after Richard, and a chaotic battle ensues. Puffs is killed in a grenade blast, while Richard swears revenge before being captured. The Ugandan government places Kampala under martial law, and the film abruptly ends as the Video Joker thanks the audience for watching.

Cast 

 Kakule William as Captain Alex: Uganda's best soldier, tasked with destroying the Tiger Mafia.
 Sseruyna Ernest as Richard: Leader of the Tiger Mafia.
 Bukenya Charles as Bruce U: Captain Alex's brother and shaolin martial artist.
 Nakyambadde Prossy as Ritah: One of Richard's many wives.
 G. Puffs as Puffs: Richard's Russian subordinate.
 Faizat Muhammed as Natasha
 Kaggwa Bonny as Minister
 Babirye Ssekweyama as Vicky
 Bisaso Dauda as Rocky
 Musisi David as Tom
 Ssebanja Ivan as the Master
 VJ Emmie as the voice of the Video Joker

Production 
Production began in late 2009 in the ghettos of Nateete. Nabwana was inspired to create the film by his love of Hollywood action movies and martial arts films from his childhood. The helicopter scenes in the film were based upon his experiences during the Ugandan Bush War where Nabwana and his brother were chased by a helicopter.

Nabwana shot the film in January 2010 and edited it using a computer he assembled from old parts. The film's props and camera equipment were fabricated from scrap metal at a machine shop next to Nabwana's house. The actors supplied their own costumes; one of them was given a mask so he could play two different roles in the same scene. Squibs used to simulate gunshot wounds were made from condoms filled with red food coloring and tied to fishing lines before being taped to the actors' chests; Nabwana previously used cow blood, but was forced to discontinue it after one of his actors developed brucellosis.

The original version of the film was intended for local distribution in Kampala, with the dialogue recorded in the native language of Luganda. After the Luganda trailer for the film went viral on YouTube, Nabwana reappropriated the local video joker practice for a Western audience and hired VJ Emmie to provide commentary on the film in English.

Throughout the film, a panpipes cover of the Seal song "Kiss from a Rose", as well as a piano cover of the ABBA song "Mamma Mia", can be heard.

Release and reception 
Who Killed Captain Alex? sold over 10,000 copies in DVD sales in Uganda, and pirated copies of the film have sold an estimated 10 times that amount.

The official trailer of the film uploaded to YouTube on 30 January 2010 quickly developed a cult following and currently has over 3.79 million views, . The film itself was uploaded on Wakaliwood's YouTube channel on 1 March 2015. , it has over 7.43 million views.

The film was released alongside Bad Black in the Wakaliwood Supa Action Vol. 1 Blu-ray/DVD combo by the American Genre Film Archive (AGFA) on 14 May 2019. The Blu-ray release features the option to watch Who Killed Captain Alex? with or without the VJ Emmie narration, plus subtitles in 11 languages, and welcome videos by Nabwana IGG for 14 countries.

Who Killed Captain Alex? was generally received well by critics and audiences alike, who saw it as an endearing "so bad it's good" experience, despite its technical limitations.

Sequel 
Nabwana IGG completed work on the 2010 sequel Tebaatusasula (Luganda: "Those Who Were Screwed Over") when a massive power surge in Wakaliga destroyed the hard drive that contained the film footage, resulting in it becoming a lost film.

On 2 March 2015, Wakaliwood set up a Kickstarter campaign to raise US$160 for the film Tebaatusasula: Ebola. The studio was able to receive US$13,181 from 374 backers by 1 April. Tebaatusasula: Ebola serves as the direct sequel to Who Killed Captain Alex? and a remake of the lost Tebaatusasula film.

On 1 August 2022, Nabwana IGG's Twitter announced that a sequel was in production and that shooting was currently in progress.

Notes

References

External links 
 
 
 
 

2010s English-language films
2010s martial arts comedy films
2010s war films
2015 action comedy films
2015 films
2015 martial arts films
English-language Ugandan films
Films about revenge
Films about terrorism in Africa
Films released on YouTube
Films set in Uganda
Films shot in Uganda
Kung fu films
Ugandan war films
Internet memes